Ludwig II (Ludwig Otto Friedrich Wilhelm; 25 August 1845 – 13 June 1886) was King of Bavaria from 1864 until his death in 1886.  
He also held the titles of Count Palatine of the Rhine, Duke of Bavaria, Duke of Franconia, and Duke in Swabia.

Ludwig ascended to the throne in 1864 at the age of 18. Two years later, Bavaria and Austria fought a war against Prussia lasting only a matter of weeks, which they lost. However, in the Franco-Prussian War of 1870, Bavaria sided with Prussia in their successful war against France. Despite Ludwig's reluctance to support the Unification of Germany, Bavaria and 21 other monarchies became part of the new German Empire in 1871, with Wilhelm I, the King of Prussia and Ludwig's cousin, as the German Emperor. Bavaria retained a large degree of autonomy within the Empire under the new Imperial Constitution.

Ludwig increasingly withdrew from day-to-day affairs of state in favour of extravagant artistic and architectural projects. He commissioned the construction of lavish palaces: Neuschwanstein Castle, Linderhof Palace and Herrenchiemsee. He was also a devoted patron of the composer Richard Wagner. Ludwig spent all his own private royal revenues (although not state funds as is commonly thought) on these projects, borrowed extensively, and defied all attempts by his ministers to restrain him. This extravagance was used against him to declare him insane, an accusation that has since come under scrutiny. Ludwig was taken into custody and effectively deposed on 12 June 1886, and he and his doctor were found dead on the following day. His death was ruled to be a suicide but this too has been disputed. Today, his architectural and artistic legacy includes many of Bavaria's most important tourist attractions.

Early life

Born at Nymphenburg Palace (located in what is today part of central Munich), he was the elder son of Maximilian II of Bavaria and Marie of Prussia, Crown Prince and Princess of Bavaria, who became King and Queen in 1848 after the abdication of the former's father, Ludwig I, during the German Revolution. His parents intended to name him Otto, but his grandfather insisted that his grandson be named after him, since their common birthday, 25 August, is the feast day of Saint Louis IX of France, patron saint of Bavaria (with "Ludwig" being the German form of "Louis"). His younger brother, born three years later, was named Otto.

Like many young heirs in an age when kings governed most of Europe, Ludwig was continually reminded of his royal status. King Maximilian wanted to instruct both of his sons in the burdens of royal duty from an early age. Ludwig was both extremely indulged and severely controlled by his tutors and subjected to a strict regimen of study and exercise. Some point to these stresses of growing up in a royal family as the causes for much of his odd behavior as an adult.

Ludwig was not close to either of his parents. King Maximilian's advisers had suggested that on his daily walks he might like, at times, to be accompanied by his future successor. The King replied, "But what am I to say to him? After all, my son takes no interest in what other people tell him." Later, Ludwig would refer to his mother as "my predecessor's consort". He was far closer to his grandfather, the deposed and notorious King Ludwig I.

Ludwig's childhood years did have happy moments. It was decorated in the Gothic Revival style with many frescoes depicting heroic German sagas, most notably images of Lohengrin, the Knight of the Swans. The family also visited Lake Starnberg (Then called lake Würm.) As an adolescent, Ludwig became close friends with his aide de camp, Prince Paul, a member of the wealthy Bavarian Thurn und Taxis family. The two young men rode together, read poetry aloud, and staged scenes from the Romantic operas of Richard Wagner. The friendship ended when Paul became engaged in 1866 with a commoner. During his youth, Ludwig also initiated a lifelong friendship with his cousin Duchess Elisabeth in Bavaria, later Empress of Austria.

Early reign 

Crown Prince Ludwig was in his 19th year when his father died after a three-day illness, and he ascended the Bavarian throne. Although he was not prepared for high office, his youth and brooding good looks made him popular in Bavaria and elsewhere. He continued the state policies of his father and retained his ministers.

His real interests were in art, music, and architecture. One of the first acts of his reign, a few months after his accession, was to summon Wagner to his court.

Ludwig was notably eccentric in ways that made serving as Bavaria's head of state problematic. He disliked large public functions and avoided formal social events whenever possible, preferring a life of seclusion that he pursued with various creative projects. He last inspected a military parade on 22 August 1875 and last gave a court banquet on 10 February 1876. His mother had foreseen difficulties for Ludwig when she recorded her concern for her extremely introverted and creative son who spent much time day-dreaming. These idiosyncrasies, combined with the fact that Ludwig avoided Munich and participating in the government there at all costs, caused considerable tension with the king's government ministers, but did not cost him popularity among the citizens of Bavaria. The king enjoyed traveling in the Bavarian countryside and chatting with farmers and labourers he met along the way. He also delighted in rewarding those who were hospitable to him during his travels with lavish gifts.

Austro-Prussian and Franco-Prussian Wars 
Unification with Prussia took center stage from 1866.  In the Austro-Prussian War, which began in August, Ludwig supported Austria against Prussia. Austria and Bavaria were defeated, and Bavaria was forced to sign a mutual defense treaty with Prussia.  When the Franco-Prussian War broke out in 1870, Bavaria was required to fight alongside Prussia.  After the Prussian victory over France, Bismarck moved to complete the Unification of Germany.

In November 1870, Bavaria joined the North German Confederation, thus losing its status as an independent kingdom.  However, the Bavarian delegation under Minister-President Count Otto von Bray-Steinburg secured privilleged status for Bavaria within the empire. Bavaria retained its own diplomatic corps and its own army, which would come under Prussian command only in times of war.

In December 1870, Bismarck used financial concessions to induce Ludwig with the support of the king's equerry Maximilian Count von Holnstein to write the so-called , a letter endorsing the creation of the German Empire with King Wilhelm I of Prussia as Emperor.  Nevertheless, Ludwig regretted Bavaria's loss of independence and refused to attend Wilhelm's 18 January proclamation as German Emperor in the Palace of Versailles.  Ludwig's brother Prince Otto and his uncle Luitpold went, instead. Otto criticized the celebration as ostentatious and heartless in a letter to his brother.

In the new Imperial Constitution, the Kingdom of Bavaria was able to secure for itself extensive rights, in particular regarding military sovereignty. Not only did the Royal Bavarian army retain, like the kingdoms of Saxony and Württemberg, its own troops, War Ministry and military justice system, but it was also excluded from the Empire-wide regimental re-numbering of the army regiments and would only come under Imperial control in times of war. The officers and men of the Bavarian Army continued to swear their oaths to the King of Bavaria and not the German Emperor. Nevertheless, the uniform cut, equipment and training was standardised to the Prussian model. When field-grey uniforms were introduced, only the cockade and a blue-and-white lozenge edging to the collar distinguished Bavarian units.

Engagement and sexual orientation 

The greatest stress of Ludwig's early reign was pressure to produce an heir. This issue came to the forefront in 1867. Ludwig became engaged to Duchess Sophie in Bavaria, his cousin and the youngest sister of his dear friend, Empress Elisabeth of Austria. They shared a deep interest in the works of Wagner. The engagement was announced on 22 January 1867; a few days earlier, Ludwig had written Sophie, "The main substance of our relationship has always been … Richard Wagner's remarkable and deeply moving destiny." Ludwig repeatedly postponed the wedding date, and finally cancelled the engagement in October.  After the engagement was broken off, Ludwig wrote to his former fiancée, "My beloved Elsa! Your cruel father has torn us apart. Eternally yours, Heinrich." (The names Elsa and Heinrich came from characters in Wagner's opera Lohengrin.) Sophie later married Prince Ferdinand, Duke of Alençon, grandson of French King Louis Philippe I, at Possenhofen Castle at which Ludwig II unexpectedly attended the reception.

Ludwig never married nor had any known mistresses. His diary, private letters, and other documents reveal his strong homosexual desires, which he struggled to suppress to remain true to the teachings of the Catholic Church. Homosexuality had not been punishable in Bavaria since 1813, but the unification of Germany under Prussian hegemony in 1871 instated Paragraph 175, which criminalized homosexual acts between males.

Throughout his reign, Ludwig had a succession of close friendships with men, including his aide-de-camp the Bavarian prince Paul von Thurn und Taxis, his chief equerry and master of the horse, Richard Hornig, the Hungarian theater actor Josef Kainz, and courtier Alfons Weber. Letters from Ludwig reveal that the quartermaster of the royal stables, Karl Hesselschwerdt, acted as his male procurer. Ludwig's original diaries from 1869 onward were lost during World War II, and all that remain today are copies of entries made during the 1886 plot to depose him.

Patron 
After 1871, Ludwig largely withdrew from politics, and devoted himself to his personal creative projects, most famously his castles, for which he personally approved every detail of the architecture, decoration, and furnishing.

Ludwig and Wagner 

Ludwig was intensely interested in the operas of Richard Wagner. This interest began when Ludwig first saw Lohengrin at the impressionable age of 15, followed by Tannhäuser ten months later. Wagner's operas appealed to the king's fantasy-filled imagination.

Wagner had a notorious reputation as a political radical and philanderer, and was constantly on the run from creditors. However, on 4 May 1864, the 51-year-old Wagner was given an unprecedented 1¾ hour audience with Ludwig in the Royal Palace in Munich; later, the composer wrote of his first meeting with Ludwig: "Alas, he is so handsome and wise, soulful and lovely, that I fear that his life must melt away in this vulgar world like a fleeting dream of the gods." Ludwig was probably the savior of Wagner's career. Without Ludwig,  Wagner's later operas are unlikely to have been composed, much less premiered at the prestigious Munich Royal Court Theatre (now the Bavarian State Opera).

A year after meeting the King, Wagner presented his latest work, Tristan und Isolde, in Munich to great acclaim. However, the composer's perceived extravagant and scandalous behaviour in the capital was unsettling for the conservative people of Bavaria, and the King was forced to ask Wagner to leave the city six months later, in December 1865. Ludwig considered abdicating to follow Wagner, but Wagner persuaded him to stay.

Ludwig provided the Tribschen residence for Wagner in Switzerland. Wagner completed Die Meistersinger there; it was premiered in Munich in 1868. When Wagner returned to his "Ring Cycle", Ludwig demanded "special previews" of the first two works (Das Rheingold and  Die Walküre) at Munich in 1869 and 1870.

Wagner, however, was now planning his great personal opera house at Bayreuth. Ludwig initially refused to support the grandiose project. However, when Wagner exhausted all other sources, he appealed to Ludwig, who loaned him 100,000 thalers to complete the work. Ludwig also paid for the Wahnfried villa for Wagner and his family to reside in, constructed 1872–74. In 1876, Ludwig attended the dress rehearsal and third public performance of the complete Ring Cycle at the Festspielhaus.

Theater 
Ludwig's interest in theater was by no means confined to Wagner. In 1867, he appointed Karl von Perfall as director of his new court theater. Ludwig wished to introduce Munich theater-goers to the best of European drama. Perfall, under Ludwig's supervision, introduced them to Shakespeare, Calderón, Mozart, Gluck, Ibsen, Weber, and many others. He also raised the standard of interpretation of Schiller, Molière, and Corneille.

Between 1872 and 1885, the King had 209  ('private performances') given for himself alone or with a guest, in the two court theaters, comprising 44 operas (28 performances of Wagner's operas including eight of Parsifal), 11 ballets, and 154 plays (the principal theme being Bourbon France) at a cost of 97,300 marks. This was not due so much to misanthropy, but as the King complained to the theatre actor-manager Ernst Possart: "I can get no sense of illusion in the theatre so long as people keep staring at me, and follow my every expression through their opera-glasses. I want to look myself, not to be a spectacle for the masses."

Castles 

Ludwig used his personal fortune (supplemented annually from 1873 by 270,000 marks from the ) to fund the construction of a series of elaborate castles. In 1867, he visited Eugène Viollet-le-Duc's work at Pierrefonds, and the Palace of Versailles in France, as well as the Wartburg near Eisenach in Thuringia, which largely influenced the style of his construction. In his letters, Ludwig marvelled at how the French had magnificently built up and glorified their culture (e.g., architecture, art, and music) and how miserably lacking Bavaria was in comparison.  His dream became  to accomplish the same for Bavaria. These projects provided employment for many hundreds of local laborers and artisans and brought a considerable flow of money to the relatively poor regions where his castles were built. Figures for the total costs between 1869 and 1886 for the building and equipping of each castle were published in 1968: Schloß Neuschwanstein 6,180,047 marks; Schloß Linderhof 8,460,937 marks (a large portion being expended on the Venus Grotto); Schloß Herrenchiemsee (from 1873) 16,579,674 marks In order to give an equivalent for the era, the British Pound sterling, being the monetary hegemon of the time, had a fixed exchange rate (based on the gold standard) at £1 = 20.43 Goldmarks.

In 1868, Ludwig commissioned the first drawings for his buildings, starting with Neuschwanstein and Herrenchiemsee, though work on the latter did not commence until 1878.

Neuschwanstein 

 ('New Swanstone Castle') is a dramatic Romanesque fortress with soaring fairy-tale towers. It is situated on an Alpine crag above Ludwig's childhood home, Castle  ('Upper Swan County Palace'). Hohenschwangau was a medieval knights' castle that his parents had purchased. Ludwig reputedly had seen the location and conceived of building a castle there while still a boy.

In 1869, Ludwig oversaw the laying of the cornerstone for Schloss Neuschwanstein on a breathtaking mountaintop site. The walls of Neuschwanstein are decorated with frescoes depicting scenes from the legends used in Wagner's operas, including Tannhäuser, Tristan und Isolde, Lohengrin, Parsifal, and the somewhat less than mystic Die Meistersinger.

Linderhof 

In 1878, construction was completed on Ludwig's Schloss Linderhof, an ornate palace in neo-French Rococo style, with handsome formal gardens. The grounds contained a Venus grotto lit by electricity, where Ludwig was rowed in a boat shaped like a shell. After seeing the Bayreuth performances, Ludwig built  ('Hunding's Hut', based on the stage set of the first act of Wagner's Die Walküre) in the forest near Linderhof, complete with an artificial tree and a sword embedded in it. (In Die Walküre, Siegmund pulls the sword from the tree.) Hunding's Hut was destroyed in 1945, but a replica was constructed at Linderhof in 1990. In 1877, Ludwig had Einsiedlei des Gurnemanz (a small hermitage, as seen in the third act of Parsifal) erected near Hunding's Hut, with a meadow of spring flowers. The king would retire to read. (A replica made in 2000 can now be seen in the park at Linderhof.) Nearby a Moroccan House, purchased at the Paris World Fair in 1878, was erected alongside the mountain road. Sold in 1891 and taken to Oberammergau, it was purchased by the government in 1980 and re-erected in the park at Linderhof after extensive restoration. Inside the palace, iconography reflected Ludwig's fascination with the absolutist government of  France. Ludwig saw himself as the "Moon King", a romantic shadow of the earlier "Sun King", Louis XIV of France. From Linderhof, Ludwig enjoyed moonlit sleigh rides in an elaborate 18th-century sleigh, complete with footmen in 18th-century livery.

Herrenchiemsee 

In 1878, construction began on Herrenchiemsee, a partial replica of the palace at Versailles, sited on the Herreninsel in the Chiemsee. It was built as Ludwig's tribute to Louis XIV of France, the magnificent "Sun King". Only the central portion of the palace was built; all construction halted on Ludwig's death. What exists of Herrenchiemsee comprises , a "copy in miniature" compared with Versailles' 551,112 ft².

Munich Residenz Palace royal apartment 
The following year, Ludwig finished the construction of the royal apartment in the Residenz Palace in Munich, to which he had added an opulent conservatory or winter garden on the palace roof. It was started in 1867 as quite a small structure, but after extensions in 1868 and 1871, the dimensions reached 69.5 x 17.2 x 9.5 m. It featured an ornamental lake complete with skiff, a painted panorama of the Himalayas as a backdrop, an Indian fisher-hut of bamboo, a Moorish kiosk, and an exotic tent. The roof was a technically advanced metal and glass construction. The winter garden was closed in June 1886, partly dismantled the following year, and demolished in 1897.

Later projects 
In the 1880s, Ludwig continued his elaborate schemes.

The first design was a sketch by Christian Jank in 1883 "very much like the Townhall of Liège". Subsequent designs showed a modest villa with a square tower and a small Gothic castle. By 1885, a road and water supply had been provided at Falkenstein but the old ruins remained untouched.

Ludwig also proposed a Byzantine palace in the Graswangtal, and a Chinese summer palace by the Plansee in Tyrol. These projects never got beyond initial plans.

For Berg Castle, Ludwig had a fifth tower constructed for it called "Isolde" and used the castle frequently as his summer residence. When Empress Maria Alexandrovna of Russia visited Berg in 1868, he had the castle magnificently decorated for the duration of her stay there; the castle otherwise, by his standards, was modestly furnished.

Controversy and struggle for power 
Although the king had paid for his pet projects out of his own funds and not the state coffers, that did not necessarily spare Bavaria from financial fallout. By 1885, the king was 14 million marks in debt, had borrowed heavily from his family, and rather than economizing, as his financial ministers advised him, he planned further opulent designs without pause. He demanded that loans be sought from all of Europe's royalty, and remained aloof from matters of state. Feeling harassed and irritated by his ministers, he considered dismissing the entire cabinet and replacing them with fresh faces. The cabinet decided to act first.

Seeking a cause to depose Ludwig by constitutional means, the rebelling ministers decided on the rationale that he was mentally ill, and unable to rule. They asked Ludwig's uncle, Prince Luitpold, to step into the royal vacancy once Ludwig was deposed. Luitpold agreed, on condition the conspirators produced reliable proof that the king was, in fact, helplessly insane.

Between January and March 1886, the conspirators assembled the  'Medical Report', on Ludwig's fitness to rule. Most of the details in the report were compiled by Maximilian Count von Holnstein, who was disillusioned with Ludwig and actively sought his downfall. Holnstein used bribery and his high rank to extract a long list of complaints, accounts, and gossip about Ludwig from among the king's servants. The litany of supposed bizarre behavior included his pathological shyness, his avoidance of state business, his complex and expensive flights of fancy, dining outdoors in cold weather and wearing heavy overcoats in summer, sloppy and childish table manners, dispatching servants on lengthy and expensive voyages to research architectural details in foreign lands; and abusive, violent threats to his servants.

The degree to which these accusations were accurate may never be known. The conspirators approached Bismarck, who doubted the report's veracity, calling it "rakings from the King's wastepaper-basket and cupboards". Bismarck commented after reading the report that "the Ministers wish to sacrifice the King, otherwise they have no chance of saving themselves". He suggested that the matter be brought before the Bavarian Diet and discussed there, but did not stop the ministers from carrying out their plan.

In early June, the report was finalized and signed by a panel of four psychiatrists: Dr. Bernhard von Gudden, chief of the Munich Asylum; Dr. Hubert von Grashey (who was Gudden's son-in-law); and their colleagues, Dr. Friedrich Wilhelm Hagen and Dr. Max Hubrich. The report declared in its final sentences that the king suffered from paranoia, and concluded, "Suffering from such a disorder, freedom of action can no longer be allowed and Your Majesty is declared incapable of ruling, which incapacity will be not only for a year's duration, but for the length of Your Majesty's life". The men had never met the king, except for Gudden, only once, 12 years earlier, and none had ever examined him. Questions about the lack of medical diagnosis make the legality of the deposition controversial. Adding to the controversy are the mysterious circumstances under which King Ludwig died. (Today, the claim of paranoia is not considered correct; Ludwig's behavior is rather interpreted as a schizotypal personality disorder and he may also have suffered from Pick's disease during his last years, an assumption supported by a frontotemporal lobar degeneration mentioned in the autopsy report.)

Ludwig's only younger brother and successor, Otto, was considered insane, providing a convenient basis for the claim of hereditary insanity.

Deposition 

At 4 am on 10 June 1886, a government commission including Holnstein and Gudden arrived at Neuschwanstein to deliver the document of deposition to the King formally and to place him in custody. Tipped off an hour or two earlier by a faithful servant, his coachman Fritz Osterholzer, Ludwig ordered the local police to protect him, and the commissioners were turned back from the castle gate at gunpoint. In an infamous sideshow, the commissioners were attacked by the 47-year-old baroness Spera von Truchseß, out of loyalty to the king, who flailed at the men with her umbrella and then rushed to the king's apartments to identify the conspirators. Ludwig then had the commissioners arrested, but after holding them captive for several hours, released them. Prince Ludwig Ferdinand was the only member of the Bavarian royal family who always remained on friendly terms with his cousin (with the exception of Elisabeth, Empress of Austria), so Ludwig II wrote him a telegram; the latter immediately intended to follow this call, but was prevented from leaving Nymphenburg Palace by his uncle Luitpold, who was about to take over government as the ruling Prince Regent.

That same day, the government under Minister-President Johann von Lutz publicly proclaimed Luitpold as Prince Regent. The king's friends and allies urged him to flee, or to show himself in Munich, and thus regain the support of the people. Ludwig hesitated, instead issuing a statement, allegedly drafted by his aide-de-camp Count Alfred Dürckheim, which was published by a Bamberg newspaper on 11 June:

The Prince Luitpold intends, against my will, to ascend to the regency of my land, and my erstwhile ministry has, through false allegations regarding the state of my health, deceived my beloved people, and is preparing to commit acts of high treason. [...] I call upon every loyal Bavarian to rally around my loyal supporters to thwart the planned treason against the King and the fatherland.

The government succeeded in suppressing the statement by seizing most copies of the newspaper and handbills. Anton Sailer's pictorial biography of the King contains a photograph of this rare document. The authenticity of the Royal Proclamation is doubted, however, as it is dated 9 June, before the commission arrived, it uses "I" instead of the royal "We" and  orthographic errors are included. As the king dithered, his support waned. Peasants who rallied to his cause were dispersed, and the police who guarded his castle were replaced by a police detachment of 36 men who sealed off all entrances to the castle.

Eventually, the king decided he would try to escape, but he was too late. In the early hours of 12 June, a second commission arrived. The King was seized just after midnight and at 4 am was taken to a waiting carriage. He asked Dr. Gudden, "How can you declare me insane? After all, you have never seen or examined me before," only to be told that "it was unnecessary; the documentary evidence [the servants' reports] is very copious and completely substantiated. It is overwhelming." Ludwig was transported to Berg Castle on the shores of Lake Starnberg, south of Munich.

Death 

On the afternoon of the next day, 13 June 1886, Dr. Gudden accompanied Ludwig on a stroll in the grounds of Berg Castle. They were escorted by two attendants. On their return, Gudden expressed optimism to other doctors concerning the treatment of his royal patient. Following dinner, at around 6 pm, Ludwig asked Gudden to accompany him on a further walk, this time through the Schloß Berg parkland along the shore of Lake Starnberg. Gudden agreed; the walk may even have been his suggestion, and he told the aides not to join them. His words were ambiguous ("No attendant may come with [us]") and whether they were meant to follow at a discreet distance is not clear.  The two men were last seen at about 6:30 pm; they were due back at 8 pm, but never returned. After searches were made for more than two hours by the entire castle staff in a gale with heavy rain, at 10:30 pm that night, the bodies of both the King and von Gudden were found, head and shoulders above the shallow water near the shore. The King's watch had stopped at 6:54. Gendarmes patrolling the park had neither seen nor heard anything unusual.

Ludwig's death was officially ruled a suicide by drowning, but the official autopsy report indicated that no water was found in his lungs. Ludwig was a very strong swimmer in his youth, the water was approximately waist deep where his body was found, and he had not expressed suicidal feelings during the crisis. Gudden's body showed blows to the head and neck and signs of strangulation, leading to the suspicion that he was strangled, although no other evidence was found to prove this.

Murder theory 
Speculation exists that Ludwig was murdered by his enemies while attempting to escape from Berg. One account suggests that the king was shot. The King's personal fisherman, Jakob Lidl (1864–1933), stated, "Three years after the king's death I was made to swear an oath that I would never say certain things – not to my wife, not on my deathbed, and not to any priest … The state has undertaken to look after my family if anything should happen to me in either peacetime or war." Lidl kept his oath, at least orally, but left behind notes that were found after his death. According to Lidl, he had hidden behind bushes with his boat, waiting to meet the king, to row him out into the lake, where loyalists were waiting to help him escape. "As the king stepped up to his boat and put one foot in it, a shot rang out from the bank, apparently killing him on the spot, for the king fell across the bow of the boat." However, the autopsy report indicates no scars or wounds were found on the body of the dead king; on the other hand, many years later, Countess Josephine von Wrbna-Kaunitz would show her afternoon tea guests a grey Loden coat with two bullet holes in the back, asserting it was the one Ludwig was wearing. Another theory suggests that Ludwig died of natural causes (such as a heart attack or stroke) brought on by the cool water (12 °C) of the lake during an escape attempt.

Funeral
Ludwig's remains were dressed in the regalia of the Order of Saint Hubert, and lay in state in the royal chapel at the Munich Residence Palace. In his right hand, he held a posy of white jasmine picked for him by his cousin the Empress Elisabeth of Austria. After an elaborate funeral on 19 June 1886, Ludwig's remains were interred in the crypt of the Michaelskirche in Munich. His heart, however, does not lie with the rest of his body. Bavarian tradition called for the heart of the king to be placed in a silver urn and sent to the Chapel of Grace in Altötting, where it was placed beside those of his father and grandfather.

Three years after his death, a small memorial chapel was built overlooking the site and a cross was erected in the lake. A remembrance ceremony is held there each year on 13 June.

Succession
The King was succeeded by his brother Otto, but since Otto was considered incapacitated by mental illness due to a diagnosis by Dr. Gudden and had been under medical supervision since 1883, the king's uncle Luitpold remained regent. Luitpold maintained the regency until his own death in 1912 at the age of 91. He was succeeded as regent by his eldest son, also named Ludwig. The regency lasted for 13 more months until November 1913, when Regent Ludwig deposed the still-living, but still-institutionalized King Otto, and declared himself King Ludwig III of Bavaria. His reign lasted until the end of World War I, when monarchy in all of Germany came to an end.

Legacy 

Though many considered Ludwig peculiar, the question of clinical insanity remains unresolved. The prominent German brain researcher Heinz Häfner has disagreed with the contention that  clear evidence existed  for Ludwig's insanity. Others believe he may have suffered from the effects of chloroform used in an effort to control chronic toothache rather than any psychological disorder. His cousin and friend, Empress Elisabeth, held that, "The King was not mad; he was just an eccentric living in a world of dreams. They might have treated him more gently, and thus perhaps spared him so terrible an end."

One of Ludwig's most quoted sayings was, "I wish to remain an eternal enigma to myself and to others."

Today visitors pay tribute to King Ludwig by visiting his grave as well as his castles. Ironically, the very castles which were causing the king's financial ruin have today become extremely profitable tourist attractions for the Bavarian state. The palaces, given to Bavaria by Ludwig III's son Crown Prince Rupprecht in 1923, have paid for themselves many times over and attract millions of tourists from all over the world to Germany each year.

Architecture 

Unsurprisingly, Ludwig II had a great interest in architecture. His paternal grandfather, King Ludwig I, had largely rebuilt Munich. It was known as the 'Athens on the Isar'. His father, King Maximilian II, had also continued with more construction in Munich, as well as the construction of Hohenschwangau Castle, the childhood home of Ludwig II, near the future Neuschwanstein Castle of Ludwig II. Ludwig II had planned to build a large opera house on the banks of the Isar River in Munich. This plan was vetoed by the Bavarian government. Using similar plans, a festival theatre was built later in his reign from Ludwig's personal finances at Bayreuth.

 Winter Garden, Residenz Palace, Munich, an elaborate winter garden built on the roof of the Residenz Palace in Munich. It featured an ornamental lake with gardens and painted frescos. It was roofed over using a technically advanced metal and glass construction. After the death of Ludwig II, it was dismantled in 1897 due to water leaking from the ornamental lake through the ceiling of the rooms below. Photographs and sketches still record this incredible creation which included a grotto, a Moorish kiosk, an Indian royal tent, an artificially illuminated rainbow and intermittent moonlight.

 Neuschwanstein Castle, or 'New Swan Stone Castle', a dramatic Romanesque fortress with Byzantine, Romanesque and Gothic interiors, which was built high above his father's castle: Hohenschwangau. Numerous wall paintings depict scenes from the legends Wagner used in his operas. Christian glory and chaste love figure predominantly in the iconography, and may have been intended to help Ludwig live up to his religious ideals, but the bedroom decoration depicts the illicit love of Tristan & Isolde (after Gottfried von Strasbourg's poem). The castle was not finished at Ludwig's death; the Kemenate was completed in 1892 but the watch-tower and chapel were only at the foundation stage in 1886 and were never built. The residence quarters of the King – which he first occupied in May 1884 – can be visited along with the servant's rooms, kitchens as well as the monumental throne room. Unfortunately the throne was never completed although sketches show how it might have looked on completion.Neuschwanstein Castle is a landmark well known by many non-Germans, and was used by Walt Disney in the twentieth century as the inspiration for the Sleeping Beauty Castles at Disney Parks around the world. The castle has had over 50 million visitors since it was opened to the public on 1 August 1886, including 1.3 million in 2008 alone.

 Linderhof Castle, an ornate palace in neo-French Rococo style, with handsome formal gardens. Just north of the palace, at the foot of the Hennenkopf, the park contains a Venus grotto where Ludwig was rowed in a shell-like boat on an underground lake lit with red, green or "Capri" blue effects by electricity, a novelty at that time, provided by one of the first generating plants in Bavaria. Stories of private musical performances here are probably apocryphal; nothing is known for certain. In the forest nearby a romantic wooded hut was also built around an artificial tree (see Hundinghütte above). Inside the palace, iconography reflects Ludwig's fascination with the absolutist government of Ancien Régime France. Ludwig saw himself as the "Moon King", a romantic shadow of the earlier "Sun King", Louis XIV of France. From Linderhof, Ludwig enjoyed moonlit sleigh rides in an elaborate eighteenth-century sleigh, complete with footmen in eighteenth-century livery. He was known to stop and visit with rural peasants while on rides, adding to his legend and popularity. The sleigh can today be viewed with other royal carriages and sleds at the Carriage Museum (Marstallmusem) at Nymphenburg Palace in Munich. Its lantern was illuminated by electricity supplied by a battery. There is also a Moorish Pavilion in the park of Schloß Linderhof.

 Herrenchiemsee, a replica (although only the central section was ever built) of Louis XIV of France's Palace of Versailles, France, which was meant to outdo its predecessor in scale and opulence – for instance, at 98 meters the Hall of Mirrors and its adjoining Halls of War and Peace is slightly longer than the original. The palace is located on the Herren Island in the middle of the Chiemsee Lake. Most of the palace was never completed once the king ran out of money, and Ludwig lived there for only 10 days in October 1885, less than a year before his mysterious death. Tourists come from France to view the recreation of the famous Ambassadors' Staircase. The original Ambassadors' Staircase at Versailles was demolished in 1752.
 Ludwig also outfitted Schachen king's house with an overwhelmingly decorative Oriental style interior, including a replica of the famous Peacock Throne.
 The Bayreuth Festspielhaus was built for and under the supervision of Richard Wagner, with funding provided by King Ludwig, as a showcase for Wagner's operas.
 Falkenstein, a planned, but never executed "robber baron's castle" in the Gothic style. A painting by Christian Jank shows the proposed building as an even more fairytale version of Neuschwanstein, perched on a rocky cliff high above Castle Neuschwanstein.

Ludwig II left behind a large collection of plans and designs for other castles that were never built, as well as plans for further rooms in his completed buildings. Many of these designs are housed today in the King Ludwig II Museum at Herrenchiemsee Castle. These building designs date from the latter part of the King's reign, beginning around 1883. As money was starting to run out, the artists knew that their designs would never be executed. The designs became more extravagant and numerous as the artists realized that there was no need to concern themselves with economy or practicality.

Arts 

It has been said that Richard Wagner's late career is part of Ludwig's legacy, since he almost certainly would have been unable to complete his opera cycle Der Ring des Nibelungen or to write his final opera, Parsifal, without the king's support.

Ludwig also sponsored the premieres of Tristan und Isolde, Die Meistersinger von Nürnberg, and, through his financial support of the Bayreuth Festival, those of Der Ring des Nibelungen and Parsifal.

Cultural references
The so-called "Swan King" is also said to have inspired the story behind the classical ballet Swan Lake by Russian composer Pyotr Ilyich Tchaikovsky. This could be referenced to the days of his childhood when he spent much of his youth in a castle named  ('high region of the swan') in the Bavarian Alps. Ludwig grew up there among swan images and icons, and the nearby  ('Swan Lake').

Film portrayals of Ludwig II include the German productions Ludwig II (1955), directed by Helmut Käutner, and Ludwig: Requiem for a Virgin King (1972), directed by Hans-Jürgen Syberberg, as well as Italian director Luchino Visconti's Ludwig (1973); he also appears as a character in an American biographical film of Wagner, Magic Fire (1955), directed by William Dieterle, and in Wagner (1983), a British television miniseries directed by Tony Palmer.

The background of The Beast Within: A Gabriel Knight Mystery 1995 computer mystery game plot is centered on the person of Ludwig II.  

A popular 2014 board game, Castles of Mad King Ludwig, is named for Ludwig II and inspired by his penchant for elaborate and whimsical castles; Neuschwanstein Castle is pictured on the box. The 2022 collector’s edition of the game features a “Towers” expansion that incorporates new tiles and miniatures based on eight of the king’s castles. 

The 2010 thriller The Secret Crown by Chris Kuzneski is based on the antics of Ludwig II, weaving fiction with known facts about the monarch.

Honours and arms

Ancestors

Notes

References

Citations

Sources 

 English-language biographies and related information on Ludwig II
 
 
 
 Chapman-Huston, Desmond. Bavarian Fantasy: The Story of Ludwig II. (1955) (Much reprinted but not entirely reliable; the author died before completing the biography.)
 Collas, Philippe. Louis II de Bavière et Elisabeth d'Autriche, âmes sœurs, Éditions du Rocher, Paris/Monaco 2001) 
 
 King, Greg. The Mad King: The Life and Times of Ludwig II of Bavaria. (1996) .
 Krückmann, Peter O.: The Land of Ludwig II: the Royal Castles and Residences in Upper Bavaria and Swabia (Prestel Verlag, Munich, 2000; 64 pages, 96 colour illus, 23 x 30 cm) .
 
 Merkle, Ludwig: Ludwig II and his Dream Castles (Stiebner Verlag, Munich, 2nd edition 2000; 112 pages, 27 colour & 35 monochrome illus., 28.5 x 24.5 cm) .
 
 Rall, Hans; Petzet, Michael; Merta, Franz. King Ludwig II. Reality and Mystery. (Schnell & Steiner, Regensburg, 2001. . (This English translation of König Ludwig II. Wirklichkeit und Rätsel is based on the 1980 German edition, despite revisions contained in the 1986 and subsequent German editions. Includes an itinerary by Merta of Ludwig's travels 1864–86. Rall [1912–98] was formerly Chief Archivist of the Geheimes Hausarchiv in Munich.)
 Richter, Werner. The Mad Monarch: The Life and Times of Ludwig II of Bavaria. (Chicago, 1954; 280 pages; abridged translation of German biography)
 Spangenberg, Marcus: Ludwig II – A Different Kind of King (Regensburg, 2015; 175 pages; translation Margaret Hiley, Oakham, Rutland) .
 Spangenberg, Marcus: The Throne Room in Schloss Neuschwanstein: Ludwig II of Bavaria and his vision of Divine Right (1999) .
 : 112 pages, 132 illus., 21 cm: Engl. edition of Ludwig II König von Bayern: Mythos und Wahrheit [2010]. The author was formerly Director of the Munich Civic Museum.
 Wrba, Ernst (photos) & Kühler, Michael (text). The Castles of King Ludwig II. (Verlagshaus Würzburg, 2008; 128 richly illustrated pages.) .

 German-language biographies and related information on Ludwig II
 Botzenhart, Christof: Die Regierungstätigkeit König Ludwig II. von Bayern – "ein Schattenkönig ohne Macht will ich nicht sein" (München, Verlag Beck, 2004, 234 S.) .
 Design, Julius: Wahnsinn oder Verrat – war König Ludwig II. von Bayern geisteskrank? (Lechbruck, Verlag Kienberger, 1996)
 
 
 Petzet, Michael: König Ludwig und die Kunst (Prestel Verlag, München, 1968) (Exhibition catalogue)
 Petzet, Detta und Michael: Die Richard Wagner-Bühne Ludwigs II. (München, Prestel-Verlag, 1970: 840 pages, over 800 illus., 24.5x23cm) (Even for the non-German reader this is an important source of illustrations of designs, stage settings & singers in the early productions of Wagner's operas at Munich & Bayreuth.)
 . New edition of 1980 book.
 Reichold, Klaus: König Ludwig II. von Bayern – zwischen Mythos und Wirklichkeit, Märchen und Alptraum; Stationen eines schlaflosen Lebens (München, Süddeutsche Verlag, 1996)
 Richter, Werner: Ludwig II., König von Bayern (1939; frequently reprinted: 14. Aufl.; München, Stiebner, 2001, 335 S.) . (See above for English translation. Richter 1888–1969 was a professional biographer of great integrity.)
 Schäffler, Anita; Borkowsky, Sandra; Adami, Erich: König Ludwig II. von Bayern und seine Reisen in die Schweiz – 20. Oktober – 2. November 1865, 22. Mai – 24. Mai 1866, 27. Juni – 14. Juli 1881; eine Dokumentation (Füssen, 2005)
 Wolf, Georg Jacob (1882–1936): König Ludwig II. und seine Welt (München, Franz Hanfstaengl, 1922; 248 pages, many monochrome illus., 24 cm)
 Spangenberg, Marcus: Ludwig II. – Der andere König (Regensburg, ³2015; 175 pages) 
 Spangenberg, Marcus: Der Thronsaal von Schloss Neuschwanstein: König Ludwig II. und sein Verständnis vom Gottesgnadentum (1999) .
 Hacker, Rupert: Ludwig II. von Bayern in Augenzeugenberichten. (1966, 471 pages) (A valuable anthology of published & archival material, compiled by the Director of the Bavarian Civil Service College)
 Wöbking, Wilhelm: Der Tod König Ludwigs II. von Bayern. (Rosenheimer Verlagshaus, 1986, 414 pages) (Includes many documents from the Bavarian State Archives.)
 Schlimm, Jean Louis: König Ludwig II. Sein leben in Bildern und Memorabilien (Nymphenburger, München, 2005; 96 pages, many illus., 24 x 24 cm) .
 Rall, Hans; Petzet, Michael; & Merta, Franz: König Ludwig II. Wirklichkeit und Rätsel (Regensburg, Schnell & Steiner, 3rd edition 2005: 192 pages, 22 colour & 52 monochrome illus., 22.5x17cm) .
 Nöhbauer, Hans F.: Auf den Spuren König Ludwigs II. Ein Führer zu Schlössern und Museen, Lebens- und Errinerungsstätten des Märchenkönigs. (München, Prestel Verlag, 3rd edition 2007: 240 pages, 348 illus, with plans & maps, 24x12cm) .
 Baumgartner, Georg: Königliche Träume: Ludwig II. und seine Bauten. (München, Hugendubel, 1981: 260 pages, lavishly illustrated with 440 designs, plans, paintings & historic photos.; 30.5 x 26 cm) .
 Hilmes, Oliver: Ludwig II. Der unzeitgemäße König, (Siedler Verlag, München), 1st edition October 2013: 447 pages (the first biographer with exclusive access to the private archives of the House of Wittelsbach), .

External links 

 The romance of King Ludwig II. of Bavaria; his relations with Wagner and his Bavarian fairy places by Frances A Gerard 1901 English
 Ludwig the Second, king of Bavaria by Clara Tschudi 1908 English
A royal recluse; memories of Ludwig II. of Bavaria by Werner Bertram b. 1900 English
 BBC R4 Great Lives programme on Ludwig – listen online: BBC Radio 4 - Great Lives, Series 26, Ludwig II of Bavaria
The 125th Anniversary of the Death of King Ludwig II, photo essay by Alan Taylor, "In Focus", The Atlantic, 13 June 2011
 Ludwig II of Bavaria: Life and Castles
 New theory about the possible murder of Ludwig II
 History Course - The Flamboyant Bavarian King Ludwig II History & Culture Academy of Latgale, 2020
  of the ballet Illusions – like "Swan Lake"
 Virtual exhibition: King Ludwig II of Bavaria – Life, Legacy, Legend, in the culture portal bavarikon

 
1845 births
1886 deaths
19th-century Kings of Bavaria
19th-century German LGBT people
Burials at St. Michael's Church, Munich
LGBT royalty
House of Wittelsbach
LGBT heads of state
German LGBT people
LGBT Roman Catholics
German patrons of music
Princes of Bavaria
Knights of the Golden Fleece of Austria
Grand Crosses of the Order of Saint Stephen of Hungary
Suicides by drowning in Germany
German art collectors
19th-century art collectors
Richard Wagner
Patrons of the arts
1880s suicides
Lohengrin